The 1992 UK & Ireland Greyhound Racing Year was the 66th year of greyhound racing in the United Kingdom and Ireland.

Roll of honour

Summary
The industry finally received a levy of sorts. On 10 March Tory chancellor Norman Lamont announced a reduction in betting tax and asked the bookmakers for a voluntary arrangement whereby a fund could be directed to the greyhound racing industry. He had given a clear signal that he expected bookmakers to pay the industry and the British Greyhound Racing Fund was born. This fund relied on the voluntary payments of bookmakers and the big three firms Ladbrokes, William Hill and Corals paid and encouraged smaller bookmakers to participate.

The positive was the fact that bookmakers had agreed but the negative was the fact that the payment equated to 0.25%. The proposed payment resulted in the Greyhound Board refusing to agree with a fund that was controlled by the bookmakers. However they would eventually give in and accepted the £1.2 million, which mainly went back into prize money.

The National Greyhound Racing Club (NGRC) released the annual returns, with totalisator turnover at £91,766,414 and attendances recorded at 3,864,288 from 6154 meetings. The 17.5% track tote deduction was ended with tracks now able to choose their own percentage which inevitably resulted in increases; the Greyhound Racing Association and Corals angered patrons by charging 25%, followed by Ladbrokes at 19.7%.

Murlens Abbey trained by John Copplestone was voted Greyhound of the Year after winning the Arc, the Edinburgh Cup and the East Anglian Derby. Farloe Melody was voted Irish Greyhound of the Year after winning the 1992 English Greyhound Derby, Easter Cup and Dundalk International.

John McGee won the Greyhound Trainer of the Year for the fifth successive year. He also secured his second Trainers Championship, winning four of the eight races that formed the event, he finished on 56 points, which was 22 points ahead of second placed Patsy Byrne on 34.

Tracks
Corals sold Powderhall to Eddie Ramsay. Independent track Berwick opened but Aldershot in Tongham closed in November.

The debt ridden Brent Walker the owners of William Hill and Hackney Wick Stadium were selling assets in order to avoid administration.

News
Racing expanded with betting shops allowed to open in the evenings and on Sundays, the first ever Sunday fixture was held at Sunderland featuring the Mailcom Northern Puppy Derby heats. GRA parent company Wembley plc. announced losses of £8m despite a £13m profit in its UK operation.

Canterbury play host to a new TV channel called Sportscast and also scrapped eight dog races on evening cards after tote turnover on them drops lower than six dog races. British Breeding shows a significant decrease from 43% to 26% of registered greyhounds and continues to go down.

Competitions
The best hurdler since Sherrys Prince emerged, a white and brindle dog called Kildare Slippy. The Paddy Hancox trained greyhound had reached the 1991 Grand National final, at Hall Green. He won the 1992 Grand National final by 9¾ lengths recording 28.52, a new track record. When the time was announced it stunned the crowd because the track record for 474 metres on the flat at Hall Green was 28.56. Kildare Slippy had just jumped five hurdles and completed the circuit four spots (1 spot = 0.01 sec) faster than the existing flat record making it one of the greatest individual runs in history. In addition to the run he broke the track record at Catford setting new figures of 23.73 which was faster than the Scurry Gold Cup final. A 28.09 track record at Powderhall was just nine spots slower than the time set by Murlens Abbey (the eventual greyhound of the year) in the Edinburgh Cup final. He won the Scottish Grand National before he attempted to win the Irish Grand National. Despite a new track record at Shelbourne Park in an incredible 29.18, he missed the break in the final and failed to achieve the triple crown. A Linda Mullins trained hurdler called Deerpark Jim won 31 races form 45 starts and was denied greater success because Kildare Slippy was around the same time.

An event called the Reading Masters was inaugurated with the provincial track of Reading offering a first prize of £15,000. Terry Kibble's Dempsey Duke was the first winner. The Scottish Greyhound Derby ended in a win for Glideaway Sam but only because the Irish Derby champion Ardfert Mick, trained by Matt O'Donnell suffered a serious injury when easily set for victory, he passed the line trailing in last and badly lame.

Natalie and Nick Savva enjoyed a great year with a 1-2 in the John Humphreys Gold Collar final with Westmead  and Westmead Spirit, followed by the Laurent Perrier Grand Prix success of Westmead Darkie. A Laurels 1-2 with Balligari and Right Move was next ending with a St Leger final appearance for Westmead Darkie. Pineapple Lemon defeated Murlens Abbey in the Select Stakes at Wembley providing some reward for a very good year by the Michael Compton trained brindle. Pineapple Lemon had reached a number of finals and broken track records at Sheffield.

Principal UK races

+Track record

Totalisator returns

The totalisator returns declared to the National Greyhound Racing Club for the year 1992 are listed below.

References 

Greyhound racing in the United Kingdom
Greyhound racing in the Republic of Ireland
UK and Ireland Greyhound Racing Year
UK and Ireland Greyhound Racing Year
UK and Ireland Greyhound Racing Year
UK and Ireland Greyhound Racing Year